This list of bridges in Bosnia and Herzegovina lists bridges of particular historical, scenic, architectural or engineering interest. Road and railway bridges, viaducts, aqueducts and footbridges are included.

Historical and architectural interest bridges

Major road and railway bridges 
This table presents the structures with spans greater than 100 meters (non-exhaustive list).

Notes and references 
 Notes

 

 Others references

See also 

 List of National Monuments of Bosnia and Herzegovina
 Transport in Bosnia and Herzegovina
 Roads in Bosnia and Herzegovina
 Rail transport in Bosnia and Herzegovina
 Geography of Bosnia and Herzegovina

External links

Further reading 
 
 
 

Bosnia and Herzegovina
 
Bridges
Bridges